Jetpur is one of the 182 Legislative Assembly constituencies of Gujarat state in India. It is part of Chhota Udaipur district and is reserved for candidates belonging to the Scheduled Tribes.

Jetpur assembly constituency is one of the 182 assembly constituencies of Gujarat. It is located in Chhota Udaipur district. This seat is reserved for members of Scheduled Tribes. After the 2017 Vidhansabha Elections, Jayantibhai Rathwa (BJP) was dethroned by Sukhram Rathwa (INC).

List of segments
This assembly seat represents the following segments,

 Jetpur Pavi Taluka (Part) Villages – Lodhan, Mesara, Vankol, Sihod, Moti Bumdi, Patiya, Nana Butiyapura, Mota Butiyapura, Ranbhun, Amalpur, Gadoth, Moti Tejavav, Khandivav, Pratapnagar, Shithol, Aniyadri, Moti Amrol, Sengpur, Tamboliya, Chudel, Ambadi, Bhensavahi, Suskal, Nani Tejavav, Kukna, Chapargota, Jivanpura, Timbi, Pandhara, Visadi, Dhorivav, Jabugam, Baravad, Harakhpur, Kohivav, Vavdi, Majigam, Chhotanagar, Ratanpur, Khandiyakuva, Polanpur, Muldhar, Tokarva, Chachak, Simaliya, Tadkachhala, Vanta, Vaddhari, Khadakla, Vadatalav, Gaidiya, Sakhandra, Devmori, Gajra, Bordha, Degla, Pandharva, Sajuli, Nani Amrol, Bandi, Kosum, Deriya, Kalarani, Vantada, Dharoliya (Sakhandra), Kothiya, Sadadhari, Sherpura, Valpari, Undva, Haripura, Karsan, Rajpur (Karali), Bhindol, Dharoliya Bhindol, Ambazati, Zab (Sajva), Ghodiyala, Sadhali, Pratappura, Kavara, Chimli, Panibar, Saloj, Ghodaj, Mota Amadra (Chhatrali), Chundheli, Kadachhala, Nana Amadra (Chhatrali), Chhatrali, Karali, Thambhla, Sajva, Ambalag, Vankala, Karajvant, Jitnagar, Mora Dungari, Navi Rudhi, Ferkuva, Simal Ghoda, Khareda, Bhorda, Nani Vant, Vanadha, Juni Rudhi, Juna Timbarva, Nava Timbarva, Badaliya, Chalamali, Moti Vant, Rajvasana, Rajbodeli, Un, Navagam, Vadivada, Athavali, Mavali, Bhilvaniya, Zoz, Unada, Untkoi.
 Kavant Taluka

Members of Legislative Assembly
2007 - Mohansinh Rathwa, Indian National Congress
2012 - Jayantbhai Rathwa, Bharatiya Janata Party

Election results

2022

2017

2012

See also
 List of constituencies of Gujarat Legislative Assembly
 Gujarat Legislative Assembly

References

External links
 

Assembly constituencies of Gujarat
Chhota Udaipur district